Tom Jarvis (born 2 December 1999) is an English international table tennis player. He is a national champion and has represented England at the Commonwealth Games.

Biography
Jarvis started playing aged 5 before moving to Sweden at age 16. He was a reserve at the 2016 Summer Olympics. He became the national champion in the men's singles and men's doubles at the English National Table Tennis Championships.

In 2022, he was selected for the 2022 Commonwealth Games in Birmingham where he competed in three events; the men's doubles, the mixed doubles and the men's team events.

References

1999 births
Living people
English male table tennis players
Table tennis players at the 2022 Commonwealth Games
Commonwealth Games competitors for England
Commonwealth Games bronze medallists for England
Commonwealth Games medallists in table tennis
People educated at The Skegness Grammar School
Medallists at the 2022 Commonwealth Games